Artour Babaev, better known as Arteezy, is a Canadian professional Dota 2 player for Shopify Rebellion. He is also one of the most popular streamers among the community.

Born in Tashkent, Uzbekistan, Babaev showed much promise as a child, reaching the highest matchmaking rating on the leaderboards in public matches. In November 2013, he made his professional debut in MLG Columbus as a stand-in for Speed Gaming. In January 2014, Babaev, along with North American Dota players Universe and Fear, as well as former Heroes of Newerth players ppd and zai created "S A D B O Y S" , who were later signed by Evil Geniuses.

Also Arteezy is a popular streamer on Twitch from 2014. His Twitch channel has over 700 000 followers and he streams almost every day until November 2021. On December, 2022, Arteezy returned to streaming on Twitch after a 400-day hiatus with a peak concurrent viewership was over 22.5K and an average concurrent viewership of 17.98K.

History

2013: Early career 
On November 22, 2013, Arteezy had the opportunity to stand in for bOne7, who was unable to attend due to visa issues, and play for his previous team Speed Gaming (formerly Kaipi) at MLG Columbus. Arteezy handily defeated several more well-established midlaners, including Mushi and Dendi, en route to an underdog victory for Speed Gaming over the all-star Team DK in the finals.

2014: Birth of Evil Geniuses 
On January 31, 2014, Arteezy, along with Dota 2 veterans UNiVeRsE and Fear, as well as former Heroes of Newerth players ppd and zai, created S A D B O Y S , which had immediate success. The team won 16 out of their first 18 matches, including winning the Electronic Sports Prime/Shock Therapy Cup while going undefeated. On February 21, 2014, Arteezy and company were announced to be the new Evil Geniuses Dota 2 squad, which continued to be a top-tier team despite being from the weaker North American scene.

On March 7, 2014, the new EG attended their first LAN tournament at the Monster Energy Invitational, where they won 3–2 against Cloud9 in the finals. With this victory, the team firmly established their reputation as one of the best Dota 2 teams in the world, due in no small part to Arteezy's individual skill.

On April 29, 2014, Evil Geniuses were directly invited to compete in The International 2014 Dota 2 Championships. With top 3 finishes at three of the four major LANs prior to TI4, including a first-place finish at The Summit 1 over Team DK, EG was one of the favorites to win the biggest Dota 2 tournament of the year. EG was not as successful as the Chinese Dota 2 teams in adapting to the more aggressive play-style at TI4 but still ended with a 3rd-place finish, taking home US$1,038,416.

2015: Joined Team Secret 
After some internal issues with EG, Arteezy left the team and joined Team Secret in December 2014. With Arteezy transitioning to the carry position, Team Secret stormed through The Summit 3, Mars Dota League 2015 and ESL One Frankfurt 2015 taking 1st place at each, establishing themselves as the favorites for The International 2015. Team Secret ultimately finished 7–8th place at TI5.

Following this result, in August he rejoined Evil Geniuses as the carry, with SumaiL continuing in the mid-lane position. This new Evil Geniuses roster finished in third place in Frankfurt Major 2015 despite a strong showing early in the tournament, losing to the eventual winners of the tournament, OG.

2016: Highest ranked player 
EG again finished third at the Shanghai Major 2016 and second at Dota Pit Season 4. On March 22, 2016, Arteezy and teammate Saahil Arora, better known as Universe, left the team to join Team Secret. Universe later re-joined EG before TI6, while Arteezy remained on Team Secret. In September, Babaev left Secret during the post-TI shuffle, returning to Evil Geniuses once again with former Team OG player Cr1t.

In July 2016, Arteezy became the second player in Dota 2 history to reach 9,000 Matchmaking Rating (MMR) in online matchmaking. The first player to reach this rating was Team Liquid player Miracle-.

2017: The Manila Masters champion 
Evil Geniuses managed to get first place in The Manila Masters tournament, winning the first prize of $125,000. Later on The International 2017 tournament, despite being one of the directly invited teams, EG finished 9th-12th in the tournament. This led to the departure of position 4 player Zai, who was replaced by former team coach Fear. As of October 9, Arteezy is still an active member of the roster playing the carry role.

2018: The International 2018 
On July 27, 2018, Evil Geniuses won North America in-house tournament Summit 9 organized by Beyond The Summit. In August 2018, Arteezy and Evil Geniuses finished third place at The International 2018, marking his second 3rd-place finish at the International, his best overall performance.

2019: The International 2019 
In August 2019, Arteezy and Evil Geniuses finished 5th-6th at The International 2019. Arteezy made a remarkable performance, getting a solo rampage versus 5 enemies on his game with Evil Geniuses against Vici Gaming.

2020: The International 2020 
Due to the COVID-19 pandemic, The International was postponed until 2021.

2021: The International 2021 
In October 2021, Arteezy and Evil Geniuses achieved a 9th-12th place finish at The International 2021, receiving $800,400.

2022: The International 2022 
In October 2022, Arteezy and Evil Geniuses finished 9th-12th place at The International 2022. On November 15, 2022, it was announced that Evil Geniuses would be dropping their current Dota 2 roster. On December 9, 2022, Arteezy joined Shopify Rebellion.

References

External links

Living people
Canadian esports players
Uzbekistani emigrants to Canada
Dota players
Evil Geniuses players
Sportspeople from Tashkent
Sportspeople from Vancouver
Team Secret players
1996 births
Twitch (service) streamers